Solveig Laila Thoresen (2 January 1931 – 20 June 2018) was a Norwegian politician for the Christian Democratic Party.

She served as a deputy representative to the Parliament of Norway from Sør-Trøndelag during the terms 1977–1981 and 1981–1985. In total she met during 119 days of parliamentary session.

References

1931 births
2018 deaths
Deputy members of the Storting
Christian Democratic Party (Norway) politicians
Sør-Trøndelag politicians
Norwegian women in politics
Women members of the Storting